George Savile, 1st Marquess of Halifax,  (11 November 1633 – 5 April 1695), was an English statesman, writer, and politician who sat in the House of Commons in 1660, and in the House of Lords after he was raised to the peerage in 1668.

Background and early life, 1633–1667
Savile was born in Thornhill, in the West Riding of Yorkshire, the eldest son of Sir William Savile, 3rd Baronet, and his wife Anne Coventry, eldest daughter of Lord Keeper Thomas Coventry, 1st Baron Coventry. His father distinguished himself in the civil war in the royalist cause and died in 1644. Savile was also the nephew of Sir William Coventry, who is said to have influenced his political opinions, and of Lord Shaftesbury, afterwards his most bitter opponent, and great-nephew of the Earl of Strafford. He was the great-grandson of Sir George Savile of Lupset and Thornhill (created baronet in 1611). He was educated at Shrewsbury School in 1643 while his mother was staying with a sister in Shropshire. He later travelled in France, where he attended a Huguenot academy in Paris, stayed in Angers and Orléans, in Italy and in the Netherlands, and was also believed to have been educated in Geneva. He returned to England by 1652.

In 1660, Savile was elected Member of Parliament for Pontefract in the Convention Parliament, and this was his only appearance in the Lower House. In the same year he was made Deputy Lieutenant for the county of Yorkshire and Colonel of a foot regiment in the Yorkshire Militia.

The Duke of York sought a peerage for him in 1665, but was successfully opposed by Clarendon, on the ground of his "ill-reputation amongst men of piety and religion."  The chancellor's real motives may have been Savile's connection with Buckingham and Coventry.  The honours were, however, only deferred for a short time and were obtained after the fall of Clarendon on 31 December 1667, when Savile was created Baron Savile of Elland and Viscount Halifax.

In 1667 he was commissioned Captain to raise a troop in Yorkshire for Prince Rupert's Regiment of Horse.

Political career, 1668–1680
Halifax supported zealously the anti-French policy formulated in the Triple Alliance of January 1668. He was created a privy councillor in 1672, and, while it is believed that he was ignorant of the secret clauses in the Treaty of Dover, was chosen envoy to negotiate terms of peace with Louis XIV and the Dutch at Utrecht.  His mission was still further deprived of importance by Arlington and Buckingham (who were in the king's counsels), who anticipated his arrival and took the negotiations out of his hands.  Though he signed the compact, Halifax claimed no share in the harsh terms imposed upon the Dutch, and henceforth became a bitter opponent of the policy of subservience to French interests and of the Roman Catholic claims.

Test Act and the Catholic Question, 1673–1678
Halifax took an active part in Parliament's passage of the Test Act of 1673, and thereby forfeited his friendship with James.  In 1674 he brought forward a motion for disarming "popish recusants," and supported one by Lord Carlisle for restricting the marriages in the royal family to Protestants; but he opposed the bill introduced by Lord Danby in 1675, that imposed a test oath on officials and members of parliament, speaking "with that quickness, learning and elegance that are inseparable from all his discourses," and ridiculing the multiplication of oaths, since "no man would ever sleep with open doors. . . should all the town be sworn not to rob."  He was now on bad terms with Danby, and a witty sally at that minister's expense caused his dismissal from the council in January 1676.

He was elected a Fellow of the Royal Society in November 1675.

In 1678 he took an active part in the investigation of the "Popish Plot," to which he appears to have given excessive credence, but opposed the bill that was passed on 30 October 1678, to exclude Roman Catholics from the House of Lords.

Privy Councillor, 1679–1680
In 1679, after Danby's fall from grace, Halifax became a member of the newly constituted privy council. With Charles, who had at first "kicked at his appointment," he quickly became a favourite, his lively and "libertine" conversation being named by Bishop Gilbert Burnet as his chief attraction for the king.  His dislike of the Duke of York and of the crypto-Catholic tendencies of the court did not induce him to support the rash attempt of Lord Shaftesbury to substitute the illegitimate Duke of Monmouth for James in the succession.  He feared Shaftesbury's ascendancy in the national councils and foresaw nothing but civil war and confusion as a result of his scheme.  He declared against the exclusion of James, was made an earl in 1679, and was one of the "Triumvirate" which now directed public affairs.  He assisted in passing into law the Habeas Corpus Act. According to Sir William Temple he showed great severity in putting the laws against the Roman Catholics into force although in 1680 he voted against the execution of Lord Stafford.

The Trimmer, 1680–1682
Halifax's whole policy had been successfully directed towards uniting all parties with the object of frustrating Shaftesbury's plans. He opened communications with the Prince of Orange, and the king's illness called for summoning James from Brussels. Monmouth was compelled to retire to Holland, and Shaftesbury was dismissed. On the other hand, while Halifax was so far successful, James was given an opportunity of establishing a new influence at the court. It was with great difficulty that his retirement to Scotland was at last effected; the ministers lost the confidence and support of the "country party," and Halifax, fatigued and ill, at the close of this year, retired to his family home at Rufford Abbey. He returned in September 1680 on the occasion of the introduction of the Exclusion Bill in the Lords. The debate that followed, one of the most famous in the annals of parliament, became a duel of oratory between Halifax and his uncle Shaftesbury, the finest two speakers of the day, watched by the Lords, the Commons at the bar, and the king, who was present. It lasted seven hours. Halifax spoke sixteen times, and at last, regardless of the menaces of the more violent supporters of the bill, who closed round him, vanquished his opponent. The rejection of the bill by a majority of 33 was attributed by all parties entirely to the eloquence of Halifax. His conduct transformed the allegiance to him of the Whigs into bitter hostility, the Commons immediately petitioning the king to remove him from his councils for ever, while any favour which he might have regained with James was forfeited by his subsequent approval of the regency scheme.

Halifax retired to Rufford again in January 1681, but was present at the Oxford Parliament, and in May returned suddenly to public life and held for a year the chief control of affairs. Shaftesbury's arrest on 2 July was attributed to his influence, but in general, during the period of Tory reaction, he seems to have urged a policy of conciliation and moderation to the king. He opposed James's return from Scotland and, about this time (September), made a characteristic but futile attempt to persuade the Duke to attend the services of the Church of England and thus to end all difficulties. He renewed relations with the Prince of Orange, who in July paid a visit to England to seek support against the French designs upon Luxembourg. The influence of Halifax procured for the Dutch a formal assurance from Charles of his support; but the king informed the French ambassador that he had no intention of fulfilling his engagements, and made another secret treaty with Louis. In 1682, Halifax opposed James's prosecution of the Earl of Argyll, arousing further hostility in the duke, while the same year he was challenged to a duel by Monmouth, who attributed to him his disgrace.

Withdrawal from politics, 1682–1689
Halifax's short tenure of power ended with the return of James in May. Outwardly he still retained the king's favour and was advanced to a marquessate in August and to the office of Lord Privy Seal in October.  Being still a member of the administration, he must share responsibility for the attack now made upon the municipal franchises, especially as the new charters passed his office.  In January 1684 he was one of the commissioners "who supervise all things concerning the city and have turned out those persons who are whiggishly inclined."  He made honorable but vain endeavours to save Algernon Sidney and Lord Russell.  "My Lord Halifax," declared Tillotson in his evidence before the later inquiry, "showed a very compassionate concern for my Lord Russell and all the readiness to serve them that could be wished."  The Rye House Plot, in which it was sought to implicate them, was a disastrous blow to his policy, and in order to counteract its consequences he entered into somewhat perilous negotiations with Monmouth, and endeavoured to effect his reconciliation with the king.  On 12 February 1684, he procured the release of his old antagonist, Lord Danby. Shortly afterwards his influence at the court revived. Charles was no longer in receipt of his French pension and was beginning to tire of James and Rochester. The latter, instead of becoming lord treasurer, was, according to the epigram of Halifax which has become proverbial, "kicked upstairs," to the office of Lord President of the Council. Halifax now worked to establish better relations between Charles and the Prince of Orange and opposed the abrogation of the recusancy laws. In a debate in the cabinet of November 1684, on the question of the grant of a fresh constitution to the New England colonies, he urged with great warmth "that there could be no doubt whatever but that the same laws which are in force in England should also be established in a country inhabited by Englishmen and that an absolute government is neither so happy nor so safe as that which is tempered by laws and which sets bounds to the authority of the prince," and declared that he could not "live under a king who should have it in his power to take, whenever he thought proper, the money he has in his pocket." The opinions thus expressed were opposed by all the other ministers and highly censured by Louis XIV, James and Judge George Jeffreys.

Opposition to James II, 1685–1688

At James's accession, Halifax was deprived of much of his power and relegated to the presidency of the council.  He showed no compliance with James's preferences.  He was opposed to the parliamentary grant to the king of a revenue for life; he promoted the treaty of alliance with the Dutch in August 1685; and he expostulated with the king on the subject of the illegal commissions in the army given to Roman Catholics.  Finally, on his firm refusal to support the repeal of the Test and Habeas Corpus Acts, he was dismissed, and his name was struck out of the list of the privy council. He corresponded with the Prince of Orange, conferred with Dykveldt, the latter's envoy, but held aloof from plans which aimed at the prince's personal interference in English affairs. In 1687 he published the famous Letter to a Dissenter, in which he warns the Nonconformists against being beguiled by the "Indulgence" into joining the court party, sets in a clear light the fatal results of such a step, and reminds them that under their next sovereign their grievances would in all probability be satisfied by the law. The tract was influential and widely read.  20,000 copies were circulated through the kingdom, and a great party was convinced of the wisdom of remaining faithful to the national traditions and liberties.  He took the popular side on the occasion of the trial of the Seven Bishops in June 1688, visited them in the Tower, and led the cheers with which the verdict of "not guilty" was received in court; but the same month he refrained from signing the Invitation to William, and publicly repudiated any share in the prince's plans.  On the contrary he attended the court and refused any credence to the report that the king's newborn son, James, Prince of Wales, was supposititious.

The Revolution of 1688
After William's landing in southwest England, Halifax was present at the council called by James on 27 November 1688.  He urged the king to grant large concessions.  He accepted the mission with Nottingham and Godolphin to treat with William at Hungerford, and succeeded in obtaining moderate terms from the prince.  The negotiations were abortive, for James had resolved on flight. In the crisis that ensued, when the country was left without a government, Halifax took the lead.  He presided over the council of Lords which assembled and took immediate measures to maintain public order. On the return of James to London on 16 December 1688, after his capture at Faversham, Halifax repaired to William's camp and henceforth attached himself unremittingly to his cause.  On 17 December 1688, he carried with Lords Delamere and Shrewsbury a message from William to the king advising his departure from London, and, after the king's second flight, directed the proceedings of the executive. On the meeting of the convention on 22 January 1689, he was formally elected speaker of the House of Lords. He voted against the motion for a regency, which was only defeated by two votes.  The moderate and comprehensive character of the settlement at the revolution plainly shows his guiding hand, and it was finally through his persuasion that the Lords yielded to the Commons and agreed to the compromise whereby William and Mary were declared joint sovereigns.  On 13 February 1689, in the Banqueting House at Whitehall, he tendered the crown to them in the name of the nation, and conducted the proclamation of their accession in the city.

Return to power, 1689–1695

At the opening of the new reign Halifax had considerable influence, was made Lord Privy Seal, while Danby his rival was obliged to content himself with the presidency of the council, and controlled the appointments to the new cabinet which were made on a "trimming" or comprehensive basis.  His views on religious toleration were as wide as those of the new king. He championed the claims of the Nonconformists as against the High Church party, and he was bitterly disappointed at the miscarriage of the Comprehension Bill.  He thoroughly approved also at first of William's foreign policy; but, having excited the hostility of both the Whig and Tory parties, he now became exposed to a series of attacks in parliament which finally drove him from power.  He was severely censured for the disorder in Ireland, and an attempt was made to impeach him for his conduct with regard to the sentences on the Whig leaders.  The inquiry resulted in his favour; but notwithstanding, and in spite of the king's continued support, he determined to retire.  He had already resigned the speakership of the House of Lords, and he now (8 February 1690) quit his place in the cabinet.  He still nominally retained his seat in the privy council, but in parliament he became a bitter critic of the administration; and the rivalry of Halifax (the Black Marquess) with Danby, now Marquess of Carmarthen (the White Marquess) threw the former at this time into determined opposition.  He disapproved of William's total absorption in European politics, and his open partiality for his countrymen.  In January 1691, Halifax had an interview with Henry Bulkeley, the Jacobite agent, and is said to have promised "to do everything that lay in his power to serve the king."  This was probably merely a measure of precaution, for he had no serious Jacobite leanings.  He entered bail for Lord Marlborough when he was accused of complicity in a Jacobite plot in May 1692, and in June, during the absence of the king from England, his name was struck off the privy council.

Halifax spoke in favour of the Triennial Bill (12 January 1693) which passed the legislature but was vetoed by William, suggested a proviso in a renewed Licensing of the Press Act, which restricted its operation to anonymous works, and approved the Place Bill (1694).  He opposed, probably on account of the large sums he had engaged in the traffic of annuities, the establishment of the Bank of England in 1694. Early in 1695 he delivered a strong attack on the administration in the House of Lords.  After a short illness, arising from a rupture caused by vomiting after eating an undercooked chicken, he died on 5 April that year, at the age of sixty-one. He was buried in Henry VII's chapel in Westminster Abbey.

Family

Halifax was twice married.

In 1656, he married the Lady Dorothy Spencer, daughter of Henry Spencer, 1st Earl of Sunderland, and his wife Dorothy Sidney ("Sacharissa"), leaving a family including Lady Anne Savile (1663 – c. January 1690) and William Savile, 2nd Marquess of Halifax (1665 – 31 August 1700). By his marriage with Dorothy Spencer, he was brother-in-law to Lord Sunderland; despite the family tie, the two men were bitter and lifelong political opponents.

Dorothy died in 1670 and he married again in 1672, Gertrude Pierrepont, daughter of William Pierrepont of Thoresby. They had one daughter, Countess of Chesterfield, who seems to have inherited a considerable portion of her father's intellectual abilities. Gertrude survived him.

His eldest son Henry Savile, Lord Elland, having predeceased him in 1687, his second son William succeeded to his peerage.  On the death of the latter, in August 1700 without male issue, the peerage became extinct, and the baronetcy passed to the Saviles of Lupset, the whole male line of the Savile family ending in the person of Sir George Savile, 8th baronet, in 1784. Henry Savile, British envoy at Versailles, who died unmarried in 1687, was a younger brother of the first marquess. Halifax has been generally supposed to have been the father of the illegitimate Henry Carey, the poet.

Legacy

"Trimmer"
Halifax's influence, both as orator and as writer, on the public opinion of his day was probably unrivalled.  His intellectual powers, his high character, his urbanity, vivacity and satirical humour made a great impression on his contemporaries, and many of his witty sayings have been recorded.  Maintaining throughout his career a detachment from party, he never acted permanently or continuously with either of the two great factions, and exasperated both in turn by deserting their cause at the moment when their hopes seemed on the point of realisation. To them he appeared weak, inconstant, untrustworthy.  But the principle which chiefly influenced his political action, that of compromise, differed essentially from those of both parties, and his attitude with regard to the Whigs or Tories was thus by necessity continually changing.  Thus the regency scheme, which Halifax had supported while Charles still reigned, was opposed by him with perfect consistency at the revolution.  He readily accepted for himself the character of a "trimmer," desiring, he said, to keep the boat steady, while others attempted to weigh it down perilously on one side or the other; and he concluded his tract with these assertions: "that our climate is a Trimmer between that part of the world where men are roasted and the other where they are frozen; that our Church is a Trimmer between the frenzy of fanatic visions and the lethargic ignorance of Popish dreams; that our laws are Trimmers between the excesses of unbounded power and the extravagance of liberty not enough restrained; that true virtue hath ever been thought a Trimmer, and to have its dwelling in the middle between two extremes; that even God Almighty Himself is divided between His two great attributes, His Mercy and His Justice. In such company, our Trimmer is not ashamed of his name. . . ."

Intellectual
Halifax believed that reading, writing and arithmetic should be taught to all and at the expense of the state.  His opinions again on the constitutional relations of the colonies to the mother country, already cited, were completely opposed to those of his own period. For that view of his character which while allowing him the merit of a brilliant political theorist denies him the qualities of a man of action and of a practical politician, there is no solid basis. The truth is that while his political ideas are founded upon great moral or philosophical generalisations, often vividly recalling and sometimes anticipating the broad conceptions of Edmund Burke, they are at the same time imbued with precisely those practical qualities which have ever been characteristic of English statesmenship, and were always capable of application to actual conditions. He had no taste for abstract political dogma, but seemed to venture no further than to think that "men should live in some competent state of freedom," and that the limited monarchical and aristocratic government was the best adapted for his country.

"Circumstances," he wrote in the Rough Draft of a New Model at Sea, "must come in and are to be made a part of the matter of which we are to judge; positive decisions are always dangerous, more especially in politics."  Nor was he the mere literary student buried in books and in contemplative ease. He had none of the "indecisiveness which commonly renders literary men of no use in the world."  The constant tendency of his mind towards antithesis and the balancing of opinions did not lead to paralysis in time of action – he did not shrink from responsibility, nor show on any occasion lack of courage. At various times of crisis he proved himself a great leader.  He returned to public life to defeat the Exclusion Bill.  At the Glorious Revolution Halifax seized the reins of government and maintained public security.  His subsequent failure in collaborating with William is disappointing, but the cause has not received sufficient attention.  Party government had come to the birth during the struggles over the Exclusion Bill, and there had been unconsciously introduced into politics a novel element of which the nature and importance were not understood or suspected.  Halifax had consistently ignored and neglected party; and it now had its revenge.  Detested by the Whigs and by the Tories alike, and defended by neither, the favour alone of the king and his own transcendent abilities proved insufficient to withstand the constant and violent attacks made upon him in parliament, and he yielded to the superior force. He seems indeed himself to have been at last convinced of the necessity in English political life of party government, for though in his cautions to electors he warns them against men "tied to a party," yet in his last words he declares: "If there are two parties a man ought to adhere to that which he disliked least though in the whole he doth not approve it; for whilst he doth not list himself in one or the other party, he is looked upon as such a straggler that he is fallen upon by both. . . . Happy those that are convinced so as to be of the general opinions."

Character
The private character of Lord Halifax was in harmony with his public career. He was by no means the "voluptuary" described by Macaulay. He was on the contrary free from self-indulgence; his manner of life was decent and frugal, and his dress proverbially simple. He was an affectionate father and husband. "His heart," says Burnet, "was much set on raising his family" — his last concern even while on his deathbed was the remarriage of his son Lord Elland to perpetuate his name; and this is probably the cause of his acceptance of so many titles for which he himself affected a philosophical indifference. He showed throughout his career an honourable independence. In a period when even great men stooped to accept bribes, Halifax was known to be incorruptible; at a time when animosities were especially bitter, he was too great a man to harbour resentments. "Not only from policy," says John Reresby, "but from his disposition I never saw any man more ready to forgive than himself."

Few were insensible to his personal charm and gaiety. He excelled especially in quick repartée, in "exquisite nonsense," and in spontaneous humour. When quite a young man, just entering upon political life, Evelyn described him as "a witty gentleman, if not a little too prompt and daring." The latter characteristic was not moderated by time but persisted throughout his life. He was incapable of controlling his spirit of raillery, from jests on Siamese missionaries to sarcasms at the expense of the heir to the throne and the ridicule of hereditary monarchy. His brilliant paradoxes, his pungent and often profane epigrams were received by graver persons as his real opinions and as evidence of atheism. The latter charge he repudiated, assuring Burnet that he was "a Christian in submission," but that he could not digest iron like an ostrich nor swallow all that the divines sought to impose upon the world.

The Viking Book of Aphorisms, edited by W. H. Auden and Louis Kronenberger, contains more entries by Halifax (60) than by any other English language author except Samuel Johnson.

Writings
Halifax's speeches have not been preserved, and his political writings on this account have all the greater value. The Character of a Trimmer (1684 or 1685) was his most ambitious production, written seemingly as advice to the king and as a manifesto of his own opinions.  In it he discusses the political problems of the time and their solution on broad principles.  He supports the Test Act and, while opposing the Indulgence, is not hostile to the repeal of the penal laws against the Roman Catholics by parliament.  Turning to foreign affairs he contemplates with consternation the growing power of France and the humiliation of England, exclaiming indignantly at the sight of the "Roses blasted and discoloured while lilies triumph and grow insolent upon the comparison."  The whole is a masterly and comprehensive summary of the actual political situation and its exigencies; while, when he treats such themes as liberty, or discusses the balance to be maintained between freedom and government in the constitution, he rises to the political idealism of Bolingbroke and Burke.  The Character of King Charles II, to be compared with his earlier sketch of the king in the Character of a Trimmer, is perhaps from the literary point of view the most admirable of his writings.  The famous Letter to a Dissenter (1687) was thought by Sir James Mackintosh to be unrivalled as a political pamphlet. The Lady’s New Year’s Gift: or Advice to a Daughter, refers to his daughter Elizabeth, afterwards mother of the celebrated 4th Earl of Chesterfield (1688). In The Anatomy of an Equivalent (1688) he treats with keen wit and power of analysis the proposal to grant a "perpetual edict" in favour of the Established Church in return for the repeal of the test and penal laws.  Maxims of State appeared about 1692.  The Rough Draft of a New Model at Sea (c. 1694), though apparently only a fragment, is one of the most interesting and characteristic of his writings.  He discusses the naval establishment, not from the naval point of view alone, but from the general aspect of the constitution of which it is a detail, and is thus led to consider the nature of the constitution itself, and to show that it is not an artificial structure but a growth and product of the natural character. Multiple editions of his works have been released since his death, including H. C. Foxcroft's "Life and Letters." The most recent edition, by Mark N. Brown, is titled The Works of George Savile Marquis of Halifax, 3 vols., Oxford, Clarendon Press, 1989.  A paperback collection was edited by J. P. Kenyon for the "Pelican Classics" series in 1969, but it is now out of print.

References

External links

 
 
 
 

1633 births
1695 deaths
People from Thornhill, West Yorkshire
People educated at Shrewsbury School
Lord Presidents of the Council
Lords Privy Seal
Members of the Privy Council of England
Fellows of the Royal Society
English MPs 1660
People from Acton, London
Marquesses of Halifax
People from Newark and Sherwood (district)
Peers of England created by William III
Leaders of the House of Lords
Burials at Westminster Abbey